Neve Yarak is a moshav in central Israel. Located near Hod HaSharon, it falls under the jurisdiction of Drom HaSharon Regional Council.

History
The moshav was formed in 1951 by immigrants from Romania, and was initially called Kfar Yarkanim (lit. Greengrocer Village).

It is located partly on land that had belonged to the Palestinian village of al-Muwaylih prior to its depopulation in the 1948 Arab–Israeli War, and partly on land which used to belong to Jaljuliya.

Neve Yarak Winery was founded in 2015. The wine produced here is exclusively from Carignan grapes planted many decades ago, but not used to make wine until recently.

References

External links
Official website

Moshavim
Populated places established in 1951
Populated places in Central District (Israel)
Romanian-Jewish culture in Israel
1951 establishments in Israel